Hasanlu (also Romanized as Ḩasanlū) is a village in Qeshlaqat-e Afshar Rural District, Afshar District, Khodabandeh County, Zanjan Province, Iran. At the 2006 census, its population was 150, in 27 families.

References 

Populated places in Khodabandeh County